Pjotr Sunin is a Soviet former ski jumper.

References

External links

Living people
Russian male ski jumpers
Year of birth missing (living people)